Robert Raymond Smith Barry  (4 April 1886 – 23 April 1949) was an officer in the Royal Flying Corps and its successor, the Royal Air Force.  His most notable contribution was in developing flying instruction methods.

In December 1916 he masterminded a complete reorganisation of flying training methods at Gosport. This new training method later became known as the "Gosport System" and was adopted worldwide. The curriculum combined classroom training and dual flight instruction. Students were not led away from potentially dangerous manoeuvres but deliberately exposed to them in controlled environments so they could learn to recover from errors of judgement. The choice of training aircraft later settled on the Avro 504J.

Smith-Barry was later described by Lord Trenchard as the man who "taught the air forces of the world how to fly".

Early life

Smith-Barry was born on 1 August 1886 in Mayfair, London, the son of James Hugh Smith-Barry and his wife Charlotte Jane. He was educated at Eton College and Trinity College, Cambridge from 1904 although he left without taking a degree. He learnt to fly in 1911 at Salisbury Plain and was one of the first officers in the new Royal Flying Corps formed in August 1912.

World War I
With the outbreak of war, on 5 August 1914, Smith-Barry was appointed as a flying officer. Only days later, on 14 August, while on operations in France with No. 5 Squadron RFC, Smith-Barry's Royal Aircraft Factory B.E.8 had an engine failure and crashed, killing his passenger. Smith-Barry had had two broken legs but on hearing of the imminent arrival of Germans he managed to get back to England on his own accord. On 5 November 1915 he was made a temporary captain and less than a month later on 1 December his temporary promotion was made permanent. 3 July 1916 saw Smith-Barry temporarily promoted to major. On 23 August 1917 he was made a wing commander and temporary lieutenant-colonel. Towards the end of January 1918, he was promoted to the temporary rank of brigadier-general but he relinquished the rank on 23 February 1918. Later in 1918, his promotion to colonel in the new Royal Air Force was gazetted but this was later cancelled. He was awarded the Air Force Cross in May 1918.

Later years
Retiring to Conock Manor near Upavon, Wiltshire after the war as a country gentleman, he re-joined the Royal Air Force during the second world war as a ferry pilot and ground instructor.

Smith-Barry died in Durban, South Africa on 23 April 1949, aged 63, following an operation on his leg, which had troubled him since the crash in 1914.

References

External links
Firstworldwar.com – Robert Smith-Barry
Gosport Reunion – a 1938 Flight article on a reunion of Smith-Barry's former staff and pupils
"Robert Smith-Barry" – the 1949 Flight obituary of Smith-Barry

Royal Flying Corps officers
Royal Air Force officers
1886 births
1949 deaths
English aviators
Military personnel from London
Recipients of the Air Force Cross (United Kingdom)
People educated at Eton College
Alumni of Trinity College, Cambridge
Royal Air Force personnel of World War I
British Army personnel of World War I
Royal Air Force pilots of World War II